The Baltimore Clippers were an American basketball team based in Baltimore, Maryland that was a member of the American Basketball League.

Year-by-year

Basketball teams in Baltimore